On 6 July 1907 the British Central Africa Protectorate became the Nyasaland Protectorate and its first stamps were issued on 22 July 1908.

Stamps were marked Nyasaland Protectorate and later just Nyasaland. From 1953 to 1963 Nyasaland was united with Northern Rhodesia and Southern Rhodesia and used stamps of the Federation of Rhodesia and Nyasaland. Nyasaland resumed issuing stamps in 1963 before becoming independent. After independence in 1964, stamps were marked Malawi.

See also
Postage stamps and postal history of British Central Africa
Postage stamps and postal history of the Federation of Rhodesia and Nyasaland
Postage stamps and postal history of Malawi
Revenue stamps of Nyasaland and Malawi

References

Further reading 
Melville, Fred. British Central Africa and Nyasaland Protectorate. London, W.H. Peckitt, 1909.

External links

Nyasaland Protectorate: A report on the postal services 1909-1910 by William Cochrane.

Philately of Malawi
Nyasaland Protectorate
Nyasaland